Balearites is an extinct ancyloceratin genus included in the family Crioceratitidae, subclass Ammonoidea, from the Upper Hauterivian.

The shell, or conch, of Balearites is planispiral; whorls compressed, fairly flat sided, barely in contact (sub-gyroconic);  venter (outer rim) rounded; ribs fine, flexuous, branching equally in 2s, 3s, or 4s from weak umbilical tubercles.

Genera assumed to be related include Aegocrioceras, Crioceratites, and Hoplocrioceras.

Species
Species within the genus Balearites include:
Balearites angulicostatiformis Hoedemaker, 2013
Balearites balearis Nolan, 1894
Balearites binelli Astier, 1851
Balearites catulloi Parona, 1898
Balearites ibizensis Wiedmann, 1962
Balearites krenkeli Sarkar, 1955 (= B. montclusensis Wiedmann, 1962)
Balearites labrousseae Sarkar, 1955
Balearites lorioli Dimitrova, 1967
Balearites michalíki Vašíček & Malek, 2017
Balearites mortilleti Pictet & Loriol, 1858
Balearites nolani Sarkar, 1955
Balearites nowaki Sarkar, 1955
Balearites oicasensis Hoedemaker, 2013
Balearites pseudothurmanii Dimitrova, 1967
Balearites rotundatus Sarkar, 1955
Balearites shankariae Sarkar, 1955
Balearites theodomirensis Hoedemaker, 2013

Distribution
Fossils belonging to this genera were found on localities that are now in Slovakia, Austria, France, Spain, Switzerland, Hungary, Italy, Bulgaria, Russia and Romania.

References
Notes

Bibliography
 Arkell, W. J. et al., 1957. Mesozoic Ammonoidea, Treatise on Invertebrate Paleontology Part L, Mollusca 4. 1957.

Crioceratitidae
Ammonitida genera
Cretaceous ammonites
Fossils of France
Hauterivian life
Early Cretaceous ammonites of Europe